Elections to Bolton Metropolitan Borough Council were held on 1 May 2003. One third of the council was up for election and the Labour party lost overall control of the council to no overall control, for the first time since 1980. The Labour party continued to run the council in a minority administration. 

20 seats were contested in the election, with 7 being won by the Labour Party, 7 by the Conservatives and 6 by the Liberal Democrats.

After the election, the composition of the council was
Labour 27
Conservative 19
Liberal Democrat 14

Election result

Council Composition
Prior to the election the composition of the council was:

After the election the composition of the council was:

Ward results

Astley Bridge ward

Blackrod ward

Bradshaw ward

Breightmet ward

Bromley Cross ward

Burnden ward

Central ward

Daubhill ward

Deane-cum-Heaton ward

Derby ward

Farnworth ward

Halliwell ward

Harper Green ward

Horwich ward

Hulton Park ward

Kearsley ward

Little Lever ward

Smithills ward

Tonge ward

Westhoughton ward

Sources

Notes

References
 

2003
2003 English local elections
2000s in Greater Manchester